Goldie & the Gingerbreads was an all-female American rock band from 1962 to 1967. They were the first all-female rock band signed to a major record label. 
 
Whereas most female bands were ignored by the big record labels and their live performances rarely attracted more than gimmick-seeking crowds, the quartet consisting of three musicians and a singer: Ginger Bianco, Margo Lewis, Carol MacDonald, and Genya "Goldie" Zelkowitz (later Genya Ravan), were among the first to break into a domain dominated by men. They were signed to Decca in 1963 and to Atlantic in 1964.

Early days
In 1962, local musician Genya Zelkowitz (later known as Genya Ravan) was introduced to drummer Ginger Bianco (née Panabianco), in the New York City club where Zelkowitz was the lead singer of Richard Perry's band The Escorts. Panabianco was on stage, drumming for a friend of Perry's. This acquaintance with a female drummer inspired in Genya the idea of an all-female rock and roll band. The name of the would-be band was quickly decided on: Goldie was the name given to Genya by her mother after their arrival in the United States from post-war Poland, whilst gingerbread was a play on Ginger's name.

Richard Perry and the other members of The Escorts were college students. When the summer concert season ended, Genya and Ginger began to look for a pianist and soon recruited Carol O'Grady. Finding a female guitarist turned out to be much harder. Various ad-hoc recruits filled in as and when required, but when they accompanied Chubby Checker on his 1962 concert tour of West Germany and Switzerland, they performed without a guitarist. Organist Margo Lewis, who turned out to be the group's third permanent member, replaced O'Grady and performed with the group on the Chubby Checker tour. The following year, Goldie and the Gingerbreads found guitarist and vocalist Carol MacDonald, who at the time was signed to Atlantic/Atco Records, and she became the fourth permanent band member.

The group's first release on the Spokane Records label was titled "Skinny Vinnie". Although credited to Zelkowitz and Stan Green, the song was, in fact, the Bill Haley composition "Skinny Minnie" with slight lyric changes.

The Mods and Rockers Ball
In 1964, fashion photographer and director Jerry Schatzberg threw a party for the Warhol superstar Baby Jane Holzer that was later referred to by writer Tom Wolfe as "the Mods and Rockers ball, the party of the year." Goldie and the Gingerbreads were booked to provide the musical entertainment and impressed the assembled attendees with both their music and their inimitable presence. Among the guests at this fashionable and well-attended event were The Rolling Stones and Ahmet Ertegün, the chairman of Atlantic Records, who promptly signed them to the label.

The Gingerbreads in Europe
Later in 1964, the band met Eric Burdon and The Animals, whose manager contracted the Gingerbreads for a tour in England. These standard group tours were arranged by record companies to showcase their roster of talent and the Gingerbreads were one of up to six bands on the tour, performing on the same bill night after night in small towns. In Britain, they toured with The Rolling Stones, The Animals, The Beatles, The Yardbirds, The Hollies and The Kinks, among others.

Troubles with British working visa requirements led to the band performing dates in West Germany (where many UK and US troops were then stationed as part of the NATO defences) at venues including the Star-Club in Hamburg while they waited for their British work permits to come through.

A subsequent appearance in Paris at the Olympia earned Goldie & The Gingerbreads a favourable introduction to the French music scene, despite technical difficulties that arose during the performance.

The politics of popular music
Throughout the early 1960s, Goldie and the Gingerbreads toured extensively throughout North America. Here, the club and venue promoters were not so much interested in their music as in presenting the novelty of an all-female musical group.

Goldie and the Gingerbread's single "Can't You Hear My Heartbeat" reached No. 25 on the UK Singles Chart in 1965. Although it was also released in the United States, a recording of the same song by the heavily promoted Herman's Hermits was released nationwide with great fanfare just two weeks prior to the Gingerbreads' version, thus fatally undermining the Gingerbreads' chances for their first hit single in the U.S.

The end
Over the course of 1967 and 1968, the group began to fragment as various members came and went. A return to the United States in a final attempt to garner mainstream success there failed. Genya Ravan's strong personality and selfish leadership has been cited as the major factor in the band's split, although frustration due to making little profit from their record releases may also have been a significant issue.

Future careers
Genya Ravan went on to form Ten Wheel Drive and a career in record production and radio. She produced the Dead Boys 1977 debut album Young Loud and Snotty. She now hosts two radio shows on Little Steven's Underground Garage channel on Sirius/XM: Goldie's Garage and Chicks and Broads. Ravan's memoirs, entitled Lollipop Lounge: Memoirs of a Rock and Roll Refugee, were published in 2004 by Billboard Books.

Carol MacDonald and Ginger Bianco later formed the nucleus of jazz-fusion band Isis.

Margo Lewis is owner and president of Talent Consultants International, Ltd., a talent booking agency in New York, and a partner in Talent Source, Ltd, which manages the estate of Bo Diddley. Lewis toured with Diddley as his personal manager and as his keyboard player for the last 10 years of his life.

In 2011, Goldie and The Gingerbreads were recognized by the Rock and Roll Hall Of Fame as part of its "Women Who Rock: Vision, Passion, Power" exhibit.

1997 reunion
On November 13, 1997, the Gingerbreads performed once more to mark their 30th anniversary and to commemorate the release of The Rolling Stone Book of Women in Rock. Accompanying Ginger, Margo and Genya was Debby Hastings on bass and Diane Scanlon on guitar.

Touchstone Award
On February 3, 1998, Goldie and The Gingerbreads were presented with a Touchstone Award from NY based Women in Music. This distinction is given to women who "have the courage and inspiration to make a difference in the music industry and whose work has set new standards.". At the awards ceremony, the statuettes were presented to each member of the group by music legend Ahmet Ertegun.

Line-up
Although several other musicians played with Goldie & the Gingerbreads over the years, permanent members were:
 Genya Ravan – vocals, tambourine, saxophone 
 Ginger Bianco – drums, percussion 
 Margo Lewis – B3 organ, keyboards 
 Carol MacDonald (joined 1963) – guitar, background vocals  – MacDonald died on March 12, 2007.

Discography
Singles
"Skinny Vinnie" / "Chew Chew Fee Fi Fum" – (1964), SPOKANE 45-4005
"That's Why I Love You" / "What Kind of Man Are You" – (1965), ATCO 45-6354"Can't You Hear My Heartbeat" / "Little Boy" – (1965), DECCA 12070"That's Why I Love You" / "The Skip" – (1965), DECCA 12126"Sailor Boy" / "Please Please" – (1966), DECCA 12199"Look for Me Baby" – (1966), DECCA
"Think About the Good Times" / "Please Please" – (1966), ATCO 45-6427"Walking in Different Circles" / "Song of the Moon" – (1967), ATCO 45-6475"Think About the Good Times" – FONTANA 693CompilationsThinking About the Good Times: Complete Recordings 1964-1966'' Compilation, Goldie and the Gingerbreads, 2021 Ace

References

External links 
 Genya Ravan's website
 Goldie And The Gingerbreads
 Genya Ravan interview

All-female bands
Beat groups
American garage rock groups